Glen White (June 13, 1880 - ?) was an American actor. He appeared in 50 films between 1912 and 1921.

Selected filmography
 Bob's Baby (1913)
 The $5,000,000 Counterfeiting Plot (1914)
 The Flaming Sword (1915)
 Romeo and Juliet (1916)
 The Straight Way (1916)
 Camille (1917)
 Heart and Soul (1917)
 Her Greatest Love (1917)
 The Tiger Woman (1917)
 The Darling of Paris (1917)

External links

1880 births
Year of death missing
American male film actors
American male silent film actors
American film directors
20th-century American male actors